Praest is a railway station in Praest, Emmerich am Rhein, North Rhine-Westphalia, Germany. It lies on the Arnhem-Oberhausen railway. The train services are operated by VIAS.

Train services
The station is served by the following trains:

Regional services  Arnhem - Emmerich - Wesel - Oberhausen - Duisburg - Düsseldorf

References

External links
DB Website 
Verkehrsgemeinschaft Niederrhein 
NIAG Website 

Railway stations in North Rhine-Westphalia